Constância is a parish (freguesia) in the municipality of Constância in Portugal. The population in 2011 was 993, in an area of 8.83 km². It was originally named Punhete.

References

Freguesias of Constância